The badminton competition at the 2023 Central American and Caribbean Games will be held in San Salvador, El Salvador from 25 to 30 July at the Coliseo Complejo El Polvorín.

Participating nations 
A total of 12 countries qualified athletes. The number of athletes a nation entered is in parentheses beside the name of the country.

Medal summary

Men's events

Women's events

Mixed events

Medal table

References

External links

2023 Central American and Caribbean Games events

Central American and Caribbean Games

2023